MEFV (Mediterranean fever) is a human gene that provides instructions for making a protein called pyrin (also known as marenostrin). Pyrin is produced in certain white blood cells (neutrophils, eosinophils and monocytes) that play a role in inflammation and in fighting infection. Inside these white blood cells, pyrin is found with the cytoskeleton, the structural framework that helps to define the shape, size, and movement of a cell. Pyrin's protein structure also allows it to interact with other molecules involved in fighting infection and in the inflammatory response.

Although pyrin's function is not fully understood, it likely assists in keeping the inflammation process under control. Research indicates that pyrin helps regulate inflammation by interacting with the cytoskeleton. Pyrin may direct the migration of white blood cells to sites of inflammation and stop or slow the inflammatory response when it is no longer needed.

The MEFV gene is located on the short (p) arm of chromosome 16 at position 13.3, from base pair 3,292,027 to 3,306,626.

Related conditions
More than 80 MEFV mutations that cause familial Mediterranean fever have been identified. A few mutations delete small amounts of DNA from the MEFV gene, which can lead to an abnormally small protein. Most MEFV mutations, however, change one of the protein building blocks (amino acids) used to make pyrin. The most common mutation replaces the amino acid methionine with the amino acid valine at protein position 694 (written as Met694Val or M694V). Among people with familial Mediterranean fever, this particular mutation is also associated with an increased risk of developing amyloidosis, a complication in which abnormal protein deposits can lead to kidney failure. Some evidence suggests that another gene, called SAA1, can further modify the risk of developing amyloidosis among people with the M694V mutation.

MEFV mutations lead to reduced amounts of pyrin or a malformed pyrin protein that cannot function properly. As a result, pyrin cannot perform its presumed role in controlling inflammation, leading to an inappropriate or prolonged inflammatory response. Fever and inflammation in the abdomen, chest, joints, or skin are signs of familial Mediterranean fever. Pyrin forms an inflammasome which senses RhoA GTPases inactivation and subsequent kinases (PKN1 and PKN2) inactivation. These kinases phosphorylate two serine residues located in the linker encoded by MEFV exon 2, allowing proteins 14.3.3 to keep pyrin inflammasome in an inactive state. Mutations in these serine residues are responsible for Pyrin-Associated Autoinflammation with Neutrophilic Dermatosis (PAAND).
Recently, it has been shown that pyrin dephosphorylation is sufficient to trigger inflammasome activation in familial Mediterranean fever patients. Furthermore, while the trigger of FMF flares remain unknown, steroid hormone catabolites (pregnanolone and etiocholanaolone) have been shown to activate the pyrin inflammasome, in vitro, by interacting with the B30.2 domain (coded by exon 10).

See also 
 Familial Mediterranean fever.

References

Further reading

External links 
 
 

By: Dr. Rozan Ehab Ahmed

Mediterranean